ARA Comodoro Somellera (A-10) was a  rescue tug that served in the Argentine Navy from 1972 to 1998 classified as an aviso.  She previously served in the US Navy as USS Catawba (ATA-210) from 1945 to 1972. After being damaged beyond repair in 1998, she was sunk on purpose as a weapons target in November 2017.

Description
She had a displacement of 835 tons.

US Navy service
Catawba was laid down as ATR-137 at  Gulfport Boiler & Welding Works shipyard in Port Arthur, Texas and reclassified ATA-210 on 15 May 1944. The ship was launched on 15 February 1945 and commissioned by the United States Navy on 18 April 1945. The third ship of the United States Navy to carry the name, she was named after the Catawba River, in North Carolina. In 1959 she served in Operation Inland Seas. She was decommissioned in 1972 and transferred to the Argentine Navy.

Argentine service

The ship was named after Commodore Antonio Somellera, who joined the Argentine Navy in 1828 with his brigantine General Rondeau to fight in the Cisplatine War. She was acquired in 1972 along with her sister ship , departing together from Mayport, Florida on 6 March 1972 and arriving at Puerto Belgrano on 18 April.

Both ships served during the 1982 Falklands War where they were involved in a confused episode. The  British claimed to have sunk Comodoro Somellera with a Sea Skua missile, but this claim was subsequently dropped when the British re-evaluated claims after the war.  Comodoro Somellera spent the period of the war in the opening of the Strait of Magellan. From 1988 she was assigned to Ushuaia naval base until 1995, when she was transferred back to Puerto Belgrano.

In 1997, she participated in Operacion Calypso, an attempt to locate German U-boats sunk along the Patagonian coast.

The ship continued to serve in the Argentine Navy until 19 August 1998 when, after finishing an exercise with the Chilean Navy, she sank in the port of Ushuaia during a storm following a collision with the patrol tug . The ship was later refloated, but the hull was considered too old to be repaired and was finally retired from the naval service, being expended as a target ship in November 2017.

References

Notes

Online sources 
  Comodoro Somellera at Histarmar website

Further reading 
 Guia de los buques de la Armada Argentina 2005-2006. Ignacio Amendolara Bourdette, Editor n/a. (Spanish/English text)

Sotoyomo-class tugs of the Argentine Navy
Ships built in Port Arthur, Texas
1945 ships
World War II auxiliary ships of the United States
Cold War auxiliary ships of the United States
Ships transferred from the United States Navy to the Argentine Navy
Falklands War naval ships of Argentina
Maritime incidents in 1998
Maritime incidents in Argentina
Ships sunk in collisions
Maritime incidents in 2017